Fling in the Ring is a 1955 short subject directed by Jules White starring American slapstick comedy team The Three Stooges (Moe Howard, Larry Fine and Shemp Howard). It is the 159th entry in the series released by Columbia Pictures starring the comedians, who released 190 shorts for the studio between 1934 and 1959.

Plot
The Stooges are trainers for the boxer Chopper Kane (Richard Wessel). Their boss, Big Mike (Frank Sully), a mean-spirited prankster and mobster bets on Chopper's opponent, Gorilla Watson. He then tells the boys (after they bet all their money on the Chopper) to make the Chopper throw the fight or else.

The Stooges try to fatten up their boxer so he will lose against Watson. However, the boys have a stroke of luck when Gorilla Watson breaks his hand (attempting to punch Moe) on fight night. Unfortunately, their boss is not pleased and sends his goons after them. After the Stooges get some Stooge-style revenge on Big Mike, they are chased by his henchmen. Shemp manages to knock them out, but ends up knocking himself out as well. Moe and Larry try to revive Shemp but accidentally revive the goons, thus they take Shemp and flee the scene.

Production notes
Fling in the Ring is a remake of 1947's Fright Night (Shemp's first film with the team at Columbia), using ample stock footage from the original. A double is used (Joe Palma, filmed from behind) for Tiny Brauer (the original "Big Mike" in Fright Night), who was unavailable at the time. New scenes were filmed on April 27, 1954.
The film was released 12 days before the third commemoration of former Stooge Curly Howard's death on January 18, 1952.

See also
List of American films of 1955

References

External links 
 
 
Fling in the Ring at threestooges.net

1955 films
American black-and-white films
1955 comedy films
The Three Stooges film remakes
American boxing films
Columbia Pictures short films
Films directed by Jules White
The Three Stooges films
1950s English-language films
1950s American films
American comedy short films